The Ontario Fashion Stakes is a Canadian Thoroughbred horse race run annually since 1979 at Woodbine Racetrack in Toronto, Ontario. Run in early November, the event is open to Fillies and mares age three and older and is contested over six furlongs on Polytrack synthetic dirt.

Financingavailable holds the race record at 1:08.56 run in 2007.

It is a Grade 3 race as of 2022.

Records 
Speed Record 

 1:08.56 –  Financingavailable (2007)

Most Wins

 2  – La Voyageuse (1979, 1980)
 2  – Summer Mood (1984, 1985)
 2  – Bimini Blues (1997, 1998)
 2  – Feathers (2001, 2002)
 2  – Winter Garden (2003, 2004)
 2  – Atlantic Hurricane (2011, 2012)

Most wins by a jockey

4 – Eurico Rosa da Silva (2005, 2006, 2016, 2019)
Most wins by a trainer

 4 – Roger Attfield (1983, 1985, 1993, 2000)

Most wins by an owner

 3 – Kinghaven Farms (1984, 1985, 1993)

Winners

See also
 List of Canadian flat horse races

References

 The 2008 Ontario Fashion Stakes at Woodbine Entertainment

Ungraded stakes races in Canada
Sprint category horse races for fillies and mares
Recurring sporting events established in 1979
Woodbine Racetrack
1979 establishments in Ontario